Matagalpa is a department in central Nicaragua. It covers an area of 6,804 km2 and has a population of 600,057 (2021 est). The capital is the city of Matagalpa with a population of about 111,000.

Matagalpa is the second largest region of the country in population size, and the fifth in area (after the North Atlantic, the South Atlantic, Jinotega and Río San Juan).

Matagalpa is the most diversified region producing coffee, cattle, milk products, vegetables, wood, gold, flowers. Its extensive forests, rivers and geography are suited for ecotourism.

Municipalities 

 Ciudad Darío
 Esquipulas
 Matagalpa
 Matiguas
 Muy Muy
 Rancho Grande
 Río Blanco
 San Dionisio
 San Isidro
 San Ramón
 Sébaco
 Terrabona
 Tuma-La Dalia

References

External links 
 Portal del Norte de Nicaragua

 
Departments of Nicaragua